Baron Trump may refer to:

 Barron Trump, the youngest son of former U.S. president Donald Trump
The Baron Trump novels, two 19th century children's novels